Cathedral of the Holy Name of Mary (Archikatedralny kascioł  Imia Najsviaciejšaj  Panny Maryi) is a Roman Catholic baroque cathedral in Minsk. It is the seat of the Roman Catholic Archdiocese of Minsk-Mohilev.

It was built under the Polish rule in 1710 as a church for the Jesuit house. In 1793, after the Russian conquest of Belarusian part of the Polish–Lithuanian Commonwealth, the Jesuit order was banned and the church got a local status. Soon, after creation of the Minsk diocese, the church became the local cathedral.

The cathedral was heavily damaged in a fire in 1797, but was later fully renewed. In 1869, the Minsk diocese was liquidated and the church returned to parish status. In November 1917, the diocese was restored; Zygmunt Lazinski was appointed as a bishop.

In 1920, Lazinski was arrested by Soviet authorities, the cathedral was closed down in 1934.

During the Second World War, the Germans allowed the cathedral to function again, but after the war it was again closed down by the Soviets. In 1951, the cathedral's bell towers were intentionally destroyed by Soviet artillery and the building itself was given to the Spartak sports society.

In the beginning of the 1990s, religious services started again. In 1993, the building was given back to the Roman Catholics; by 1997 it had been renovated.

In 2005, the church was given a new organ manufactured in Austria. Around the same time, the frescoes created in the 18th century were also restored.

See also
 List of Jesuit sites

External links

The Cathedral's official website

Roman Catholic churches in Minsk
Roman Catholic cathedrals in Belarus
Landmarks in Belarus
Roman Catholic churches completed in 1710
18th-century Roman Catholic church buildings in Belarus
Baroque church buildings in Belarus
1710 establishments in Europe